Luke Gadsdon (born May 5, 1997) is a Canadian rower.

Career
In May 2021, Gadsdon competed in the men's fours event at the Final Olympic qualification tournament, finishing in second place and qualifying for the 2020 Summer Olympics. In June 2021, Gadsdon was named to Canada's 2020 Olympic team.

References

External links
 

1997 births
Canadian male rowers
Living people
Sportspeople from Hamilton, Ontario
Rowers at the 2020 Summer Olympics
21st-century Canadian people